The 2004 All-Ireland Intermediate Hurling Championship was the 21st staging of the All-Ireland hurling championship. The championship began on 16 May 2004 and ended on 4 September 2004.

Cork were the defending champions and successfully retained the title after defeating Kilkenny by 1–16 to 1–10 in a replay of the final.

Team summaries

Results

Leinster Intermediate Hurling Championship

Munster Intermediate Hurling Championship

All-Ireland Intermediate Hurling Championship

References

Intermediate
All-Ireland Intermediate Hurling Championship